Jayson Rego is a professional American rugby league player for the Ipswich Jets in the Queensland Cup. He has played Div.1 college football for the Hawaii Warriors football team as a running back. He is a United States national rugby league team international. Also selected to the 2011 All-American 7's team.  His position is fullback and wing.

References

Year of birth missing (living people)
Living people
American football running backs
American rugby league players
Rugby league fullbacks
Rugby league wingers
Ipswich Jets players
Hawaii Rainbow Warriors football players
United States national rugby league team players
Sportspeople from Honolulu
Players of American football from Honolulu
Native Hawaiian people